Swale Borough Council is the local authority for the Borough of Swale in Kent, England. The council is elected every four years. Until 2011 one third of the council was elected every year, followed by one year without election. Since the last boundary changes in 2002, 47 councillors have been elected from 25 wards.

Political control
The first election to the council was held in 1973, initially operating as a shadow authority before coming into its powers on 1 April 1974. Political control of the council since 1973 has been held by the following parties:

Leadership
The leaders of the council since 2002 have been:

Council elections
Summary of the council composition after recent council elections, click on the year for full details of each election. Boundary changes took place for the 2002 election, leading to the whole council bring elected in that year and reducing the number of seats by two.

1973 Swale District Council election
1976 Swale Borough Council election
1979 Swale Borough Council election (New ward boundaries)
1980 Swale Borough Council election
1982 Swale Borough Council election
1983 Swale Borough Council election (Borough boundary changes took place but the number of seats remained the same)
1984 Swale Borough Council election (Borough boundary changes took place but the number of seats remained the same)
1986 Swale Borough Council election
1987 Swale Borough Council election
1988 Swale Borough Council election

Borough result maps

By-election results
By-elections occur when seats become vacant between council elections. Below is a summary of recent by-elections; full by-election results can be found by clicking on the by-election name.

References

External links
Swale Borough Council

 
Council elections in Kent
District council elections in England